is a passenger railway station located in the city of Marugame, Kagawa, Japan.  It is operated by the private transportation company Takamatsu-Kotohira Electric Railroad (Kotoden) and is designated station "K18".

Lines
Okada Station is a station on the Kotoden Kotohira Line and is located 27.2 km from the opposing terminus of the line at Takamatsu-Chikkō Station.

Layout
The station consists of one island platform connected to the station building by a level crossing. The station is unattended.

Adjacent stations

History
Okada Station opened on March 15, 1927 as a station of the Kotohira Electric Railway. On November 1, 1943 it became  a station on the Takamatsu Kotohira Electric Railway Kotohira Line due to a company merger.

Surrounding area
Japan National Route 32
Japan National Route 438

Passenger statistics

Gallery

See also
 List of railway stations in Japan

References

External links

  

Railway stations in Japan opened in 1927
Railway stations in Kagawa Prefecture
Marugame, Kagawa